Two 2022 United States Senate elections in California were held concurrently on November 8, 2022, to elect a member of the United States Senate to represent the State of California. There were two ballot items for the same Class 3 seat: a special election to fill the seat for the final weeks of the 117th United States Congress (ending on January 3, 2023), and a general election for a full term (beginning on the same day), starting in the 118th United States Congress.

Incumbent Democratic Senator Alex Padilla was appointed in 2021 by Governor Gavin Newsom to fill the vacancy created by Kamala Harris's election to the vice presidency, and he sought a full term. A jungle primary for each of the terms took place on June 7. The top two candidates in each primary election, regardless of party, advanced to the special and regular general elections in November. With his advancement out of the primary, Mark P. Meuser became the first Republican since 2012 to advance to the general election, as both the 2016 and 2018 Senate elections solely featured Democrats as the top two candidates. This race was a rematch between the two, as both had previously run for the Secretary of State in 2018. Padilla ultimately won both elections. Padilla became the first Latino elected to the U.S. Senate from California, and the first male elected to the Senate from California since Pete Wilson was re-elected in 1988.

Candidates

Democratic Party

Advanced to general
Alex Padilla, incumbent U.S. Senator (2021–present) and former Secretary of State of California (2015–2021)

Eliminated in primary
Akinyemi Agbede, mathematician
Dan O'Dowd, founder and president of Green Hills Software and candidate for U.S. Senate in 1994
Douglas Howard Pierce, businessman and candidate for U.S. Senate in 2018
Obaidul Huq Pirjada, attorney
Timothy J. Ursich, doctor

Declined
Ro Khanna, U.S. Representative for California's 17th congressional district (2017–present) (endorsed Padilla)

Republican Party

Advanced to general
Mark P. Meuser, attorney and candidate for California Secretary of State in 2018

Eliminated in primary
Jon Elist, small business owner
Myron L. Hall, physician
Sarah Sun Liew, entrepreneur
Robert George Lucero Jr., consultant
Enrique Petris, businessman
Chuck Smith, retired law enforcement officer
Carlos Guillermo Tapia, businessman
Cordie Williams, marine veteran and doctor
Lijun Zhou, businesswoman (write-in, general election only)

Withdrawn 
Yvonne R. Girard, retired government employee (died)

Green Party

Eliminated in primary
James "Henk" Conn, educator and candidate for mayor of Long Beach in 2018
Pamela Elizondo, entrepreneur

Peace and Freedom Party

Eliminated in primary
John Parker, candidate for U.S. Senate in 2018 and Workers World nominee for President of the United States in 2004 (running as write-in for special election)

No party preference

Eliminated in primary
Daphne Bradford, entrepreneur and candidate for president in 2020
Eleanor Garcia, industrial worker (Socialist Workers Party)
Don J. Grundmann, chiropractor (Constitution Party)
Deon D. Jenkins
Irene Ratliff (write-in, both general and special elections)
Marc Alexander Roth (write-in, general election only)
Mark A. Ruzon (write-in, general election only), software engineer (American Solidarity Party)

Endorsements

Primary elections

Campaign
Incumbent Senator Alex Padilla was appointed to the job in January 2021 following Kamala Harris's election to the office of Vice President of the United States. Following his appointment, Padilla quickly began to focus on his 2022 re-election campaign, as the fact that he has not been elected to the position means that he has a relatively low profile. Padilla's re-election strategy focused on advocating for progressive policies and building ties with left-wing organizations that had a poor relationship with California's other Senator, Dianne Feinstein. The potential Democratic opponent to Padilla considered most likely to join the race was U.S. Representative Ro Khanna, a staunchly left-wing Democrat who rose to prominence as the co-chair of the Bernie Sanders 2020 presidential campaign, and who had a loyal base of support from California's Asian-American and Pacific Islander communities. On August 9, 2021, Khanna announced that he would be endorsing Padilla for re-election, which was viewed as likely ending any possibility that Padilla would face a serious Democratic opponent. It was noted by the San Francisco Chronicle that it was considered unlikely that Padilla would face any serious Republican opponent, as California's heavily Democratic lean caused potentially strong candidates, such as U.S. Representatives Mike Garcia and Young Kim, to prefer to remain in their positions rather than launch a long-shot Senate run.

In April 2022, billionaire businessman Dan O'Dowd entered the race, launching a $650,000 ad campaign. O'Dowd's goal with this ad buy, and with entering the race in the first place, was to "make computers safe for humanity" and draw the attention of the public and politicians to the dangers of Tesla's unfinished Full Self-Driving software being rolled out to 100,000 cars on public roads.

Special election blanket primary

Polling

Results

Regular election blanket primary

Polling

Results

General elections

Predictions

Polling
Special election

Regular election

Results

See also
 2022 United States Senate elections
 2022 California elections
 117th United States Congress
 List of special elections to the United States Senate

Notes

References

External links 
Official campaign websites
 Mark Meuser (R) for Senate
 Alex Padilla (D) for Senate

2022
California
United States Senate
California 2022
California Senate
United States Senate 2022